{{Infobox planet
 | minorplanet     = 
 | name            = 174567 Varda
 | symbol          = 
 | background      = #C2E0FF
 | image           = Varda.gif
 | image_size      = 250px
 | caption         = Hubble Space Telescope image of Varda and its satellite Ilmarë, taken in 2010 and 2011
 | discovery_ref   = 
 | discoverer      = J. A. Larsen
 | discovery_site  = Kitt Peak National Obs.
 | discovered      = 21 June 2003
 | earliest_precovery_date = 19 March 1980
 | mpc_name        = (174567) Varda
 | alt_names       = 
 | pronounced      = 
 | named_after     = Varda
 | mp_category     = TNOcubewanodetacheddistant
 | orbit_ref       = 
 | epoch           = 31 May 2020 (JD 2459000.5)
 | uncertainty     = 2
 | observation_arc = 39.12 yr (14,290 d)
 | aphelion        = 52.711 AU
 | perihelion      = 39.510 AU
 | time_periastron = ≈ 1 November 2096±4 days
 | semimajor       = 46.110 AU
 | eccentricity    = 0.14315
 | period          = 313.12 yr (114,366 d)
 | mean_anomaly    = 275.208°
 | mean_motion     =  / day
 | inclination     = 21.511°
 | asc_node        = 184.151°
 | arg_peri        = 180.072°
 | satellites      = 1  
 | flattening      =  or  
 | mean_diameter   =  
 | density         =   
 | surface_grav    = 
 | rotation        =  or   
 | albedo          =  
 | spectral_type   = IR (moderately red)B−V=V–R=V−I=
 | magnitude       = 20.5
 | abs_magnitude   =  3.4
}}174567 Varda (provisional designation ''') is a binary trans-Neptunian planetoid of the resonant hot classical population of the Kuiper belt, located in the outermost region of the Solar System. Its moon, Ilmarë, was discovered in 2009.

However, William M. Grundy et al. argue that objects in the size range of 400–1000 km, with albedos less than ≈0.2 and densities of ≈1.2 g/cm3 or less, have likely never compressed into fully solid bodies, let alone differentiated, and so are highly unlikely to be dwarf planets. It is not clear if Varda has a low or a high density.

 Discovery and orbit 

Varda was discovered in March 2006, using imagery dated from 21 June 2003 by Jeffrey A. Larsen with the Spacewatch telescope as part of a United States Naval Academy Trident Scholar project.

It orbits the Sun at a distance of 39.5–52.7 AU once every 313.1 years (over 114,000 days; semi-major axis of 46.1 AU). Its orbit has an eccentricity of 0.14 and an inclination of 21.5° with respect to the ecliptic. , Varda is 47.5 AU from the Sun. It will come to perihelion around November 2096. It has been observed 321 times over 23 oppositions, with precovery images back to 1980.

 Name 
Names for Varda and its moon were announced on 16 January 2014. Varda is the queen of the Valar, creator of the stars, one of the most powerful servants of almighty Eru Ilúvatar in J. R. R. Tolkien's fictional mythology. Ilmarë is a chief of the Maiar and Varda's handmaiden.

Planetary symbols are no longer much used in astronomy, so Varda never received a symbol in the astronomical literature. There is no standard symbol for Varda used by astrologers either. Zane Stein proposed a gleaming star as the symbol.

 Satellite 

Varda has at least one satellite, Ilmarë (or Varda I), which was discovered in 2009.

 Physical properties 
The density of both the primary and the satellite is estimated at about  assuming that they have equal density.

The equivalent diameter is 740 km, consistent with previous measurements. Given Varda's equivalent diameter derived from the occultation, its geometric albedo is measured at 0.099, making it as dark as the large plutino .

The rotation period of Varda is unknown; it has been estimated at 5.61 hours in 2015, and more recently (in 2020) as either 4.76, 5.91 (the most likely value), 7.87 hours, or twice those values.

The surfaces of both the primary and the satellite appear to be red in the visible and near-infrared parts of the spectrum (spectral class IR), with Ilmarë being slightly redder than Varda. The spectrum of the system does not show water absorption but shows evidence of methanol ice.

 See also
  – a similar trans-Neptunian object by orbit, size, and color

 Notes 

 References 
 

 External links 
 List of binary asteroids and TNOs, Robert Johnston, johnstonsarchive.net
 LCDB Data for (174567) Varda, Collaborative Asteroid Lightcurve Link''
 (174567) 2003 MW12 Precovery Images
 
 

 
174567
Discoveries by Jeffrey A. Larsen
Named minor planets
Binary trans-Neptunian objects
174567
174567
Astronomical objects discovered in 2003
Things named after Tolkien works